The Vogt–Russell theorem states that the structure of a star, in hydrostatic and thermal equilibrium with all energy derived from nuclear reactions, is uniquely determined by its mass and the distribution of chemical elements throughout its interior. Although referred to as a theorem, the Vogt–Russell theorem has never been formally proved. The theorem is named after astronomers Heinrich Vogt and Henry Norris Russell, who devised it independently.

References

Stellar astronomy